Hoplopyga brasiliensis is a species of beetles of the family Scarabaeidae.

Description

Biology
Larvae of this species are termitophilous, living in the nests of Cornitermes cumulans and Diversitermes diversimiles (Termitidae). They construct pupal chambers with the decaying wood as well as a significant layer of their own feces where they develop. The feces contains cuticular hydrocarbons that the specific termite hosts use to identify one another, suggesting that this element of chamber construction plays a role in protecting the h. brasiliensis larvae from termite patrols.

References

Scarabaeidae
Beetles described in 1833